Lagocephalus lagocephalus oceanicus, is a pufferfish of the family Tetraodontidae, found in the western Pacific Ocean in temperate and tropical waters.  Its length is up to 45 cm.  The dorsal and anal fins falcate, the caudal fin is lunate.  The lower one third of the pectoral fin is white.  It is thought to be responsible for fatal poisoning, therefore it should not be eaten.

References
 
 Tony Ayling & Geoffrey Cox, Collins Guide to the Sea Fishes of New Zealand,  (William Collins Publishers Ltd, Auckland, New Zealand 1982) 

Lagocephalus
Taxa named by David Starr Jordan